Club Deportivo Egüés is a Spanish football team based in Egüés, in the autonomous community of Navarre. Founded in 1968, it plays in Tercera División – Group 15, holding home matches at Estadio Sarriguren, with a capacity of 2,000 seats.

Season to season

34 seasons in Tercera División

Notable players
 Pablo Orbaiz

References

External links
Futbolme team profile  
Team profile at Egüés City Hall 

Football clubs in Navarre
Association football clubs established in 1968
1968 establishments in Spain